Koulgorin is a town in the Bingo Department of Boulkiemdé Province in central western Burkina Faso. It has a population of 1,894.

References

Populated places in Boulkiemdé Province